
Year 312 BC was a year of the pre-Julian Roman calendar. At the time, it was known as the Year of the Consulship of Corvus and Mus (or, less frequently, year 442 Ab urbe condita). The denomination 312 BC for this year has been used since the early medieval period, when the Anno Domini calendar era became the prevalent method in Europe for naming years.

Events 
 By place 
 Seleucid Empire 
 Ptolemy and Seleucus, the satrap of Babylonia, invade the satrapy of Syria. The resulting Battle of Gaza leads to a triumph for Ptolemy and Seleucus over Antigonus' son, Demetrius Poliorcetes ("sieger of cities"), who is captured but immediately released. Seleucus ceases his service to Ptolemy and returns to his former province, Babylonia. This event takes place on October 1 and becomes the starting point of the Seleucid era.
 Greece 
 Telesphorus enters Elis and fortifies the citadel, and enslaves the city.
 Telesphorus ends his friendship with Antigonus through betrayal.

 Sicily 
 The Syracusans ask for help against their tyrant Agathocles from the Carthaginians, who, fearing for their own possessions in Sicily, send a large force to the island.

 Roman Republic 
 The Roman censor, Appius Claudius Caecus, a patrician, enters office and begins construction of the Appian Way (the Via Appia) between Rome and Capua. He also embarks on a program of political reform, including the distribution of the landless citizens of Rome among the tribes, which at this time constitute basic political units. Appius also admits sons of freedmen into the Roman Senate. He also asserts the right of freed slaves to hold office.
 Rome gets its first pure drinking water as engineers complete the first aqueduct into the city, the Aqua Appia.

Births

Deaths 
Peithon (son of Agenor)

References